Wolf-Dieter Oschlies (19 February 1953 – 28 May 2016) was a German rower. He competed in the men's eight event at the 1976 Summer Olympics.

References

External links
 

1953 births
2016 deaths
German male rowers
Olympic rowers of West Germany
Rowers at the 1976 Summer Olympics
Sportspeople from Hildesheim